Sobralia macrantha, commonly known as the large-flowered sobralia, is a species of orchid found from north-central and southern Mexico to Central America.

See also

References

macrantha
Orchids of Mexico
Orchids of Central America
Orchids of Belize